"To a Mouse, on Turning Her Up in Her Nest With the Plough, November, 1785" is a Scots-language poem written by Robert Burns in 1785. It was included in the Kilmarnock volume and all of the poet's later editions, such as the Poems, Chiefly in the Scottish Dialect (Edinburgh Edition). According to legend, Burns was ploughing in the fields and accidentally destroyed a mouse's nest, which it needed to survive the winter. In fact, Burns's brother claimed that the poet composed the poem while still holding his plough.

The poem

In other media 
John Steinbeck took the title of his 1937 novel Of Mice and Men from a line contained in the penultimate stanza. The 1997 novel The Best Laid Plans by Sidney Sheldon also draws its title from this line, and so do the novel of the same name by Canadian author Terry Fallis and the film series based on it.

The first stanza of the poem is read by Ian Anderson in the beginning of the 2007 remaster of "One Brown Mouse" by Jethro Tull. Anderson adds the line "But a mouse is a mouse, for all that" at the end of the stanza, which is a reference to another of Burns's songs, "Is There for Honest Poverty", commonly known as "A Man's a Man for A' That".

Sharon Olds's poem "Sleekit Cowrin also references this poem.

In Douglas Adams's Hitchhikers Guide to the Galaxy series, mice are hyperintelligent pan-dimensional beings who are trying to find the Question to the Ultimate Answer of Life, the Universe, and Everything.  When their plans fail they lament that "the best laid plans of mice" don't always work out.

The Monty Python sketch 'Word Association' references the first line of the poem, and replaces the simple word "We" with "Wee sleekit cowerin' timorous beastie".

In book 2, chapters 9, 11, and 13 of The Once and Future King by T. H. White, several allusions to the poem are made. The most notable is on p. 291, where a drawbridge man says to the fleeing Sirs Grummore and Palomides, "Wee sleekit, cow'ring timorous Beastie... Oh, what panic's in thy breastie!"

The first line of the poem is frequently used by P. G. Wodehouse in his Jeeves stories and novels. Typically, a woman who has broken off her engagement uses it to describe her former lover, who has been ejected due to his cowardice. An example from The Cat-Nappers, Chapter 16 (Orlo Porter speaking): "Potty little lovers' quarrel my left eyeball. She called me a lily-livered poltroon. And a sleekit timorous cowering beastie."

The poem was alluded to in Ben Rector's song Living My Best Life.

See also 
 To a Louse

References

External links

 McGown, George William Thompson. A Primer of Burns, Paisley : A. Gardner, 1907. Fully annotated version of To a Mouse, with historical background. pp. 9–20
 Text of the poem can be found at 76. To a Mouse

1785 poems
1780s in Scotland
Scots-language works
Mice and rats in literature
Poetry by Robert Burns